Triplocephalum is a genus of flowering plants in the tribe Inuleae within the family Asteraceae.

Species
The only known species is Triplocephalum holstii, native to Tanzania.

formerly included
see Geigeria 
Triplocephalum glabrifolium - Geigeria pectidea

References

Flora of Tanzania
Monotypic Asteraceae genera
Inuleae